Tracers is a 2015 American action film directed by Daniel Benmayor with a screenplay by Matt Johnson and a story by Johnson, T.J. Scott, and Kevin Lund. The film stars Taylor Lautner, Marie Avgeropoulos, Adam Rayner, and Rafi Gavron. The film was released on March 20, 2015.

Plot 
Cam is a NYC bike messenger struggling to make ends meet. He rents a garage from a woman, Angie. While on a run, Cam wrecks his bike after a stranger named Nikki causes an accident while escaping police officers. Cam is later accosted by Jerry and Hu, enforcers who take his check and cash, warning him that he is behind on payments for a $15,000 loan to the Tong, a local gang that controls Chinatown, and warn him not to miss another payment. Cam spends his free time trying to fix his father's 1967 Pontiac GTO. Cam's boss calls, telling him that his "girlfriend" has dropped off his new bike. Cam finds Nikki to thank her and tries to copy Nikki's parkour, but fails. He also meets the rest of Nikki's group, who warn him about the dangers of parkour.

Cam begins practicing parkour. Eventually, Cam catches the attention of the group, and is invited to train with them. He is formally introduced to the rest of the squad: Jax, Tate, Nikki's older brother Dylan, and Miller, the group's leader. After a workout, Cam arrives home to find Jerry and Hu taking his father's car, taking off $5,000 dollars off his debt for it. They warn him he has one month to pay the rest of the $10,000, threatening Angie and her son. Angered, Angie packs Cam's belongings and kicks him out. Cam joins the group for work. Miller tells Cam that he must follow two rules: if Cam gets into trouble, he must call him immediately and he must stay out of Chinatown. Cam quickly becomes a valuable member of the team. He visits Angie at work and explains that he took the loan from the Tongs to help his sick mother keep her house, but that the money wasn't enough to stop foreclosure and his mother died a week after.

Cam runs into Jerry and Hu, who beat him for not having the money and give him two weeks to pay off his debt or they will kill Angie and Joey. Cam makes a move on Nikki at a party. Nikki initially reciprocates, but then runs out of the party. Miller arrives to pick her up as she is Miller's partner. Nikki apologizes to Cam for not being honest. Cam invites Nikki to leave the city with him once he clears his debt, but Nikki is hesitant. For their biggest heist yet, the group tries to rob a bank run by Vietnamese gangsters. They discover that the money had been moved earlier, and flee as reinforcements arrive. Jax is shot and killed, and Cam is arrested. Miller visits Cam while the police question him. Miller reveals himself to be James Hatcher, a corrupt DEA agent. 

Miller tells Cam he can free him by claiming him as a confidential informant for the DEA; in return, Cam must help him pull off one last heist. Cam reluctantly agrees. Cam confronts Nikki for not telling him Miller's true identity. Nikki apologizes and reveals she is indebted to Miller for helping Dylan escape custody for beating a man who had sexually assaulted her. On the day of the heist, Miller, Cam, and Dylan go to a Russian safehouse to steal a stash of diamonds. Nikki realizes Cam is being set up and goes to save him. Miller steals the diamonds and almost kills Cam, but is stopped as guards arrive and attack them. Cam takes the diamonds and flees, and Miller chases. 

Reuniting with Nikki, Cam leads Miller into a restaurant owned by Chen, leader of the Tongs. Chen reminds Miller that he has violated his agreement to never enter Chinatown and has him board a ship headed for Macau, never to return. Cam hands the diamonds to Chen, clearing his debt. Jerry congratulates Cam for clearing his debt and returns his father's car, now fully restored. Cam and Nikki drive off.

Cast 
 Taylor Lautner as Cam
 Marie Avgeropoulos as Nikki
 Adam Rayner as Miller
 Rafi Gavron as Dylan
 Christopher Jackson as Lonnie
 Luciano Acuna Jr. as Tate
 Josh Yadon as Jax
 Johnny M. Wu as Jerry
 Sam Medina as Hu
 Amirah Vann as Angie
 Christian Steel as Joey
 Wai Ching Ho as Chen

Production 
The shooting of the film began on June 18, 2013, and wrapped on August 1, 2013, with filming locations including Central Park, Riverside Park, and Long Island City. Shooting also took place in Hackensack, New Jersey

Reception

Critical response
On Rotten Tomatoes, the film has an approval rating of 23%, based on 30 reviews, with an average rating of 4.40/10. On Metacritic, the film has a weighted average score of 45 out of 100, based on reviews from 13 critics, indicating "mixed or average reviews". Called "fun to watch" for the action sequences and energetic use of young actors trained in parkour, the plot was generally regarded as a "B-Movie".

Accolades

References

External links 
 
 
 
 

2015 films
2015 action thriller films
2015 crime thriller films
American action thriller films
American crime thriller films
Films set in New York City
Parkour in film
Temple Hill Entertainment films
Films shot in New York City
Films shot in New Jersey
Saban Films films
Films scored by Lucas Vidal
Films produced by Wyck Godfrey
2010s English-language films
2010s American films